Dosman is a surname. Notable people with the surname include:

James Dosman (born 1938), Canadian scientist
Jhon Steven Mondragón Dosman (born 1994), Colombian footballer

See also
Bosman
Osman (name)

Spanish-language surnames